Madame Tussauds Singapore is a wax museum and tourist attraction at the Imbiah Lookout of Sentosa Island in Singapore. It officially opened on 25 October 2014 as the seventh Asian branch of the Madame Tussauds chain of wax attractions worldwide.

Wax figures
The wax attraction features many wax figures of notable political icons, famous superstars, sports icons and others, including Yusof Ishak, Sukarno, Lee Kuan Yew, David Beckham, Sharukh Khan, Johnny Depp and Lady Gaga. In 2015, a figure of the Singapore Girl, an iconic flight attendant for Singapore Airlines, was added. The figure was modelled after flight attendant Nur Surya Binte, and is the second figure to be made of the icon. A year later, the wax figure of Indian Prime Minister Narendra Modi was also added.

Featured personalities

World Leaders
 Mao Zedong
 Nelson Mandela
 Yusof Ishak
 Mahatma Gandhi
 Sukarno
 Lee Kuan Yew and wife Kwa Geok Choo
 Barack Obama
 Queen Elizabeth II
 Goh Chok Tong
 Lee Hsien Loong
 Narendra Modi
 Xi Jinping and First Lady Peng Liyuan
 Joko Widodo

Sports
 Cristiano Ronaldo
 Sachin Tendulkar
 David Beckham
 Fandi Ahmad
 Feng Tianwei
 Lewis Hamilton
 Muhammad Ali
 Rudy Hartono
 Sebastian Vettel
 Serena Williams
 Tiger Woods
 Yao Ming

TV & Film

 Daniel Craig as James Bond
 Tom Cruise
 Marilyn Monroe
 Arnold Schwarzenegger as Terminator
 Oprah Winfrey
 Bruce Lee
 Jackie Chan
 Jack Neo
 Gurmit Singh as Phua Chu Kang
 E.T.
 Mahesh Babu
Kajal Aggarwal
Catriona Gray
A-list
 Johnny Depp
 Leonardo DiCaprio
 Andy Lau
 Michelle Yeoh
 Huang Wenyong
 Zoe Tay
 Priyanka Chopra Jonas
 Nicole Kidman

Ultimate Film Star Experience
 Kajal Aggarwal as Indian actress
 Karan Johar
 Shahid Kapoor
 Amitabh Bachchan
 Sridevi
 Varun Dhawan

IIFA Award Experience
 Shah Rukh Khan
Mahesh babu as Indian actor
 Madhuri Dixit
 Hritik Roshan
 Aishwarya Rai
 Anushka Sharma
 Kajol
 Kareena Kapoor

Music
 Elvis Presley
 Michael Jackson
 Beyoncé
 Madonna
 Lady Gaga
 Katy Perry
 Taylor Swift
 Teresa Teng
 Jay Chou
 Dick Lee
 Stefanie Sun
 JJ Lin
 COMING SOON: Agnez Mo

K-Wave 
 Kim Woo-bin
 Bae Suzy
 Song Seung-heon

Marvel 4D Experience
 Spider-Man
 Iron Man

See also
 List of tourist attractions in Singapore

References

External links

 

Tourist attractions in Singapore
Museums in Singapore
2014 establishments in Singapore
Singapore